Beauchampius is a genus of land planarians in the tribe Pelmatoplaninini.

Description 
The genus Beauchampius includes planarians with weak cutaneous longitudinal musculature and strong parenchymal musculature forming a ring zone. The copulatory apparatus has a well-developed conical penis papilla and two female ducts opening into the genital atrium, one from the ventral female canal and other from the dorsal diverticulum that in some cases forms a seminal bursa.

Etymology 
The genus Beauchampius was named in honor of Paul Marais de Beauchamp, who studied land planarians for more than 60 years.

Species 
The genus Beauchampius includes the following species:

Beauchampius bangoianus (de Beauchamp, 1939)
Beauchampius coonoorensis (de Beauchamp, 1930)
Beauchampius crassus (de Beauchamp, 1939)
Beauchampius dawydoffi (de Beauchamp, 1939)
Beauchampius indosinicus (de Beauchamp, 1939)
Beauchampius nilgiriensis (Whitehouse, 1919)
Beauchampius sarasinorum (Graff, 1899)
Beauchampius sondaica (Loman, 1890)
Beauchampius trimeni (Graff, 1899)

References 

Geoplanidae
Rhabditophora genera